Ihar Zanyamonets (born 24 September 1989) is a retired Belarusian professional footballer. His only professional club was Torpedo Zhodino in 2009.

External links
Profile at teams.by

1989 births
Living people
Belarusian footballers
FC Torpedo-BelAZ Zhodino players
Association football forwards